Pruuna is a village in Tapa Parish, Lääne-Viru County, in northeastern Estonia.

References

 
Political and military figure Artur Sirk (1900–1937) was born in Pruuna.

Villages in Lääne-Viru County
Kreis Jerwen